Sir Thomas Charles Morgan (1783 – 28 August 1843) was an English physician and writer with an interest in philosophical and miscellaneous subject matter. His wife was the novelist Lady Morgan.

Biography
Morgan was born in Charlotte Street, Bloomsbury, a son of one John Morgan, and was raised in Smithfield, London. As a young man, he was given an annual income of £300. He studied at Eton and Cambridge and graduated from Peterhouse in 1809. He established a medical practice in London where the focus of his work was the study of cowpox and smallpox. He was a friend and supporter of Edward Jenner. He was accepted to the Royal College of Physicians of London in 1810. He married a Miss Hammond but she died in childbirth in 1810. Their daughter, Anne Hammond Morgan, survived. 

With his daughter, he moved to Ireland after his wife's death where he took a post as physician to John Hamilton, 1st Marquess of Abercorn. Abercorn's wife, the Marchioness Lady Anne Jane Gore, engineered an introduction to the Irish novelist Sydney Owenson (1776–1859) who had become famous for The Wild Irish Girl (1806). She was several years his senior.

He was knighted in Ireland in 1811 and in January 1812 he married Miss Owenson, who would henceforth be known as Lady Morgan. 
Of his knighthood, Lady Morgan's biographer wrote:  After their marriage the couple lived in Barons Court, the Abercorn seat, before eventually moving to Dublin.

From 1815 to 1817 the Morgans toured France and Lady Morgan subsequently published two historical works, France (1817), and Italy (1821), to which Thomas wrote appendices. These were popular works. They later shared credit (in 1841) for a two-volume work enigmatically titled The Book without a Name. It was a collection of previously published articles and essays.

During Morgan's residence in Ireland he devoted much of his time and talents to the cause of Catholic Emancipation, which he advocated in the public journals and periodicals. He was a lover of civil and religious liberty, and his homes in Dublin and London were, according to William Munk, "always open to sufferers in that cause from whatever land they came."

His own works included Sketches of the Philosophy of Life (1818), a scientific work, and Sketches of the Philosophy of Morals (1822) which offered a rebuttal to criticism of his first work, notably, that of Thomas Rennell. He also contributed articles to several magazines including The New Monthly Magazine and The Metropolitan Magazine.

In 1835 he was made commissioner of Irish fisheries and in July published a short story called "Glimpses of Other Worlds" that told of a high pressure steam balloon that travels to the moon.
The Morgans moved to William Street, Lowndes Square, London. 
In England, he was appointed physician to the Marshalsea prison. 
Thomas Morgan died in London on 28 August 1843.

Notes

References
Dixon, William Hepworth Lady Morgan's memoirs: autobiography, diaries and correspondence, Volume 2, 1862
Munk, William, The Roll of the Royal College of Physicians of London: 1801 to 1825, published by the Royal College of Physicians of London, 1878

1783 births
1843 deaths
19th-century English medical doctors
English writers
English knights